Nayagarh Town Railway Station is the main railway station in Nayagarh District, Odisha. Its code is NYGT. It serves Nayagarh City. The station consists of two platforms.

Trains 

 Khurda Road–Nayagarh Town Passenger
 Bhubaneswar–Nayagarh Town Sewa Express 18423

References

External links

Railway stations in Nayagarh district
Khurda Road railway division